Black Narcissus is a 1947 film by Powell and Pressburger.

Black Narcissus may also refer to:

Media 
 Black Narcissus, or Narcisse noir, a perfume introduced in 1911 by Parfums Caron
 Black Narcissus (novel), a 1939 novel by Rumer Godden
 Black Narcissus (TV series), a 2020 television adaptation of the 1939 novel

Music 
 Black Narcissus, a 1970–1976 band with Ricky Wilson
 Black Narcissus (Joe Henderson album), a 1976 album
 "Black Narcissus", a track on the 1998 Noblerot album by Ali Project
 Black Narcissus (Mephista album), a 2002 album
 Black Narcissus, a 2012 album by Nacho Picasso

See also
Narcissus (disambiguation)